Martin Rosen may refer to:

 Martin Rosen (director), American film director
 Moishe Rosen (born Martin Rosen, 1932–2010), founder of Jews for Jesus